Samuel M. Seidlin (1 May 1895 - 1955) was Russian-born American endocrinologist who pioneered the field of  by using radioiodine for diagnosis and therapy of thyroid cancer during the early 1940s.

Early life 

Samuel Seidlin was born in Dnipropetrovsk Oblast, Ukraine, to Martin S Seidlin and Sima Seidlin. He was brought to New York City as a child. He earned his MD in 1923 at Columbia University Vagelos College of Physicians and Surgeons and served as an intern and junior staff member at Johns Hopkins Hospital in Baltimore.

Career 

Seidlin established the Medical Physics Research Laboratory at Montefiore Hospital and its Endocrine Clinic in 1943. In the same year, at Montefiore Hospital in New York City, building on the success of Dr Saul Hertz's use of radioactive iodine to treat Graves' Disease, Seidlin consulted with Dr. Hertz regarding the use of RAI in the treatment of thyroid carcinoma. Dr Seidlin administered radioiodine to a patient, and used the radioisotope to locate the several metastases from adenocarcinoma of the thyroid. Seidlin continued as chief of the Endocrine Clinic and the Medical Physics Research Laboratory at Montefiore and treated 23 patients for metastatic thyroid cancer with radioiodine, utilizing from reactors for most of them.

References

Sources

1895 births
1955 deaths
Emigrants from the Russian Empire to the United States
American endocrinologists
Columbia University Vagelos College of Physicians and Surgeons alumni
20th-century American physicians
People from Dnipropetrovsk Oblast